Dirección Nacional de Aeronáutica Civil (DINAC) is the civil aviation authority of Paraguay. Its headquarters is in the World Trade Center Asuncion in the capital city, Asunción. The Departamento de Investigacion de Accidentes de Aviacion (DIAA) of DINAC investigates aviation accidents. The agency is presided over by a general director, and organised into four main areas:
Dirección de Aeronaútica (Aeronautics Directorate)
Dirección de Aeropuertos (Airports Directorate)
Dirección de Meteorología e Hidrología (Meteorology and Hydrology Directorate)
Instituto Nacional de Aeronáutica Civil (National Institute of Civil Aeronautics)

See also

List of airports in Paraguay

References

External links
 Dirección Nacional de Aeronautica Civil 

Paraguay
Organizations investigating aviation accidents and incidents
Government of Paraguay
Aviation organisations based in Paraguay
Civil aviation in Paraguay